Line S8 is a line on the Munich S-Bahn network. It is operated by DB Regio Bayern. It runs from Herrsching via Weßling, Pasing, central Munich and Munich East to Munich Airport station.

The line operates at 20-minute intervals between Weßling and Munich Airport. Two out of three trains an hour continue from Weßling to Herrsching, so that the gap between trains alternates between 20 and 40 minutes. It is operated using class 423 four-car electrical multiple units, usually as two coupled sets. In the evenings and on Sundays, they generally run as single sets.

The line runs over sections built at various times:
from Herrsching to Pasing over the Munich–Herrsching railway, opened on 1 July 1903 by the Royal Bavarian State Railways
from Pasing to the beginning of the S-Bahn trunk line over tracks running parallel to the Munich–Augsburg railway, opened by the Munich–Augsburg Railway Company on 1 September 1839
the S-Bahn trunk line from the approaches to Munich Central Station (Hauptbahnhof) to Munich East station, opened on 1 May 1971
from Munich East to Ismaning over the Munich East–Ismaning railway, opened by the Royal Bavarian State Railways. The section through Ismaning was placed underground in 1992 and the section through Unterföhring station in 2005.
from Ismaning to Munich Airport over a section of the Munich East–Munich Airport railway opened by Deutsche Bundesbahn in 1992.

S-Bahn services commenced in 1992 as S-Bahn line  between Munich Airport and Pasing. It was later merged with line , which had previously run between Nannhofen (now Mammendorf) and Ismaning. Since December 2009, line  has run from Pasing to Herrsching instead of Mammendorf, taking over a section of the former line  from  Herrsching to Ebersberg.

Operation 
 Munich Airport – Herrsching
 Munich Airport – Weßling
 Munich East (Ostbahnhof) – Germering-Unterpfaffenhofen/Gilching-Argelsried (Monday to Friday only)

References

Munich S-Bahn lines
1992 establishments in Germany